is a Japanese football player currently playing for Kawasaki Frontale and the Japanese national team.

Club statistics

1=Japanese Super Cup appearances

National team statistics

International goals
Scores and results list Japan's goal tally first.

Honours

Club
Kawasaki Frontale
J1 League (4): 2017, 2018, 2020, 2021
Emperor's Cup: 2020
J.League Cup: 2019
Japanese Super Cup (2): 2019, 2021

Individual
J.League MVP Award: 2017
J.League Top Scorer: 2017
J.League Best XI (2): 2016, 2017

References

External links
Profile at Kawasaki Frontale
 
 

1987 births
Living people
Takushoku University alumni
Association football people from Aomori Prefecture
Japanese footballers
Japan international footballers
J1 League players
J2 League players
Mito HollyHock players
Kawasaki Frontale players
2015 AFC Asian Cup players
Association football forwards
J1 League Player of the Year winners
21st-century Japanese people